The 2005 Zentiva Czech Indoor Open Open was a men's tennis tournament played on indoor hard courts in Průhonice , Czech Republic, and was part of the 2005 ATP Challenger Series.

This was the third edition of the event and was held from 22 to 27 November 2005.

Tuomas Ketola chose not to defend the title.

Raemon Sluiter won in the final 6–3, 7–5, against Nicolas Thomann.

Seeds

Draw

Finals

Top half

Bottom half

References
Main Draw

Qualifying Draw

Draws on ITF Site

Czech Indoor Open
Tennis tournaments in the Czech Republic